Afraid of the Dark is a 1991 French-British drama film directed by Mark Peploe and starring James Fox, Fanny Ardant and Paul McGann. In the film, a boy (played by Ben Keyworth) is convinced there is a murderer about as his mind begins to confuse reality and delusion.

Cast

References

External links

1991 films
French drama films
British drama films
1990s English-language films
English-language French films
1990s British films
1990s French films
Films about disability